
Laguna Larga is a lake in the Beni Department, Bolivia. At an elevation of 148 m, its surface area is 100 km2.

Lakes of Beni Department